The 2012–13 Liga Nacional Superior de Voleibol Masculino (Spanish for: 2011-12 Men's Senior National Volleyball League) or 2012-13 LNSVM is the 9th official season of the Peruvian Volleyball League. The winning club will qualify to the Men's South American Volleyball Club Championship.

Competing teams

  Circolo Sportivo Italiano (CSI)
   Flamenco (FLA)
  Hospedaje Casablanca (HCB)
  Huaquillay (HQL)
  Peerless (PRL)
  Regatas Lima (CRL)
  Universidad de Lima (UDL)
  Universidad San Martín (USM)
  Wanka (WKA)

Competition format
This season uses an "Apertura and Clausura" format, first, the "Apertura" is played, with the 9 teams competing in a Round-Robyn System against each of the other eight teams. After the Round-Robyn finishes, the top four teams play semifinals as follows: 1st VS. 4th and 2nd VS. 3rd, the winners move on to the Apertura Finals. The "Clausura" is played after a break from the Apertura, with exactly the same format. After the Clausura finishes, a play-off between the winners from the Apertura and the Clausura determines the champion of the season, in case one team wins both tournaments, that team is declared the champion.

Apertura

Pool standing procedure
Match points
Numbers of matches won
Sets ratio
Points ratio

Match won 3–0 or 3–1: 3 match points for the winner, 0 match points for the loser
Match won 3–2: 2 match points for the winner, 1 match point for the loser

Ranking

Knockout stage

Semifinals

Bronze Medal Matches

1Regatas Lima won third leg 3-0.

Gold Medal Matches

1Peerless won third leg 3-0.

Final standings

Individual awards

Most Valuable Player
 Luis Soto (Club Peerless)
Best Scorer
 Francis Mendoza (Deportivo Flamenco)
Best Spiker
 Luis Izquierdo (Deportivo Flamenco)
Best Blocker
 Ignacio Correa (Universidad de Lima)
Best Server
 Luis Soto (Club Peerless)
Best Digger
 Renzo Delgado (Club Peerless)
Best Setter
 Julian Vinasco (Regatas Lima)
Best Receiver
 Martin Portillo (Club Peerless)
Best Libero
 Renzo Delgado (Club Peerless)

References

External links
LNSV
Voleibol.pe

Volleyball competitions in Peru
2012 in Peruvian sport